Kiryat Tiv'on (also Qiryat Tiv'on) is a town in the Haifa District of Israel, in the hills between the Zvulun (Zebulon) and Jezreel valleys. Kiryat Tiv'on is the result of the municipal merger of several older settlements, Tiv'on (est. 1947), Elro'i (est. 1935), Kiryat Haroshet (est. 1935) and Kiryat Amal (est. 1937). On the outskirts of Tiv'on is a Bedouin township called Basmat Tab'un. In 2022 it had a population of 19,130.

History

Ancient Tiv'on
An ancient Jewish town called Tiv'on existed in the general area. It was mentioned in the Talmud and Mishnah. It is mentioned several times in Talmudic literature in connection with various sages, some of whom lived there.

Ottoman era
In 1859, the village of Tubaun was estimated to have a  tillage of 22 feddans. In 1875, Victor Guérin found that the village had 200 inhabitants. In 1881, the PEF's Survey of Western Palestine (SWP)  described  Tubaun as a small adobe village, on high ground, at the edge of the wood. A population list from about 1887 showed that Tuba'un had about 90  inhabitants; all Muslims.

British Mandate era
The  1922 census of Palestine showed that Tub'un had  151   inhabitants, all Muslim.

The area was acquired by the Jewish community as part of the Sursock Purchase. In 1925 a Zionist organisation purchased  30  feddans in Kiskis (present Alonim) and Tabon (present Kiryat Tiv'on) from the Sursuk family of Beirut.  At the time, there were 36 families living there. In the 1931 census  Tabun  had a population of 239, still all Muslim, in a total of 48 houses. From 1931, and lasting several years, the Jewish Agency struggled to evict the  tenant farmers from  Tabaun, from the land which was to become Tivon.

In the 1945 statistics, al Tivon (Alonim) (previously  Qusqus Taboun) had 370 Muslim and 320 Jewish inhabitants, with a total land area of 5,823 dunams.  Of this, 141 dunams were  used for plantations and irrigable land,   2,038 for cereals,  while 3,644  dunams were classified as non-cultivable land.

State of Israel
Kiryat Tiv'on was established in 1958 merging three small villages Tiv'on (founded in 1947), Kiryat Amal (founded in 1937) and Elro'i (founded in 1935). Kiryat Haroshet, founded by a rabbi from Jablona, Poland who settled there with his followers in 1935, became part of Kiryat Tiv'on in 1979.

Tiv'on was built on land owned by a British Jewish couple who bought the land in early 1945. It was later developed by the Jewish National Fund based on an urban plan drawn up by Alexander Klein, a Russian Jewish architect who was commissioned by the Jewish National Fund.

The symbol of Kiryat Tiv'on is the cyclamen, a flower that grows between the rocks, reflecting the town's appreciation of nature and its efforts to preserve the landscape and safeguard the environment.

Education
 Oranim Academic College- For educational studies.
 Ramat Hadassah youth village  - founded by the Jewish Agency for Israel.
 Kfar Tikvah, village for disabled people.

Landmarks
The town is best known for the national park, Beit She'arim, which borders it on the southwest. Beit Shearim was an important Jewish spiritual center and necropolis during the Roman period, and was once the seat of the Sanhedrin.

Notable residents
 David Elazar, former Chief of Staff of the Israel Defense Forces
 Mordechai Gur, former Chief of Staff of the Israel Defense Forces
 Tal Friedman, actor and comedian
 Tomer Hemed, footballer
 Frank Lowy, Australian businessman and third richest man in Australia as of 2016
 Rina Mor, lawyer, Miss Israel 1976 and Miss Universe 1976
 Hilla Nachshon, TV host, model and actress.
 Sara Netanyahu, wife of Israeli prime minister Benjamin Netanyahu
 Eliezer Smoli, children's author

Twin towns – sister cities

Kiryat Tiv'on is twinned with:

 Braunschweig, Germany
 Compiègne, France
 Čakovec, Croatia

See also 
 Alexander Zaid

References

Bibliography

External links 

 New version of old self-defense group guards Jewish farmlands 
Survey of Western Palestine, Map 5:    IAA, Wikimedia commons

 
Local councils in Haifa District